Haji Wazir is a citizen of Afghanistan who was captured in Pakistan in 2002, and held since then in extrajudicial detention in the United States' Bagram Theater internment facility.
He is notable because he is one of the very few detainees in Bagram who has had a writ of habeas corpus filed on his behalf.

According to Lal Gul, chairman of the Afghan Human Rights Organization, Haji Wazir: "is not a commander, not a member of the Taliban or al-Qaeda. He is a businessman."

Wazir is one of the sixteen Guantanamo captives whose amalgamated habeas corpus submissions were heard by
US District Court Judge Reggie B. Walton on January 31, 2007.

On June 29, 2009 US District Court Judge John D. Bates ruled that Wazir, unlike non-Afghans held in Bagram, was not entitled to pursue his habeas corpus petition.
The Guardian reported that Wazir was apprehended in the United Arab Emirates.

References

Bagram Theater Internment Facility detainees
Living people
Bagram captives' habeas corpus petitions
Year of birth missing (living people)